Yesterday's Papers is a song by the Rolling Stones from their 1967 album, Between the Buttons. It was the first song that Mick Jagger wrote by himself for the group. It appears as the opening track on the UK version of the album and on the US version as the second track.

Background
In the song, recorded in late 1966, Brian Jones's vibraphone and Jack Nitzsche's harpsichord are prominent: Keith Richards plays a distorted guitar with Charlie Watts on drums and Bill Wyman on bass. A bootleg recording exists of an alternate backing track that includes strings. There is also a stripped-down demo version with an early vocal track known.

Whereas the stereo mix fades after one chorus, the mono mix continues for one more full chorus. Additionally, the mono version is at one point near the end missing some of the backing vocals heard on the stereo version.

The song is supposedly directed at Jagger's ex-girlfriend Chrissie Shrimpton, whose relationship with Jagger at the time turned sour. It is noted for suggesting a negative treatment of women, comparing "yesterday's girl" to "yesterday's papers", as something that can be just thrown out, in similar fashion to a track on their previous album Aftermath, "Under My Thumb".

Chris Farlowe recorded the song, which was released as a single.

Personnel

Rolling Stones version 

According to authors Philippe Margotin and Jean-Michel Guesdon, except where noted:

The Rolling Stones
Mick Jagger vocals, tambourine
Keith Richards backing vocals, lead guitar, bass, fuzz guitar, acoustic twelve-string guitar
Brian Jones backing vocals, vibraphone
Bill Wyman backing vocals, bass
Charlie Watts drums

Additional musician
Jack Nitzsche harpsichord

Chris Farlowe version 

 Chris Farlowe lead vocals, tambourine
 The Thunderbirds backing instrumentals
 Mick Jagger producer

References

Sources

 
 

The Rolling Stones songs
1967 songs
1967 singles
Immediate Records singles
Songs written by Jagger–Richards
Song recordings produced by Andrew Loog Oldham
Chris Farlowe songs